The 1906 Tour de France was the 4th edition of Tour de France, one of cycling's Grand Tours. The Tour began in Paris on 4 July and Stage 8 occurred on 18 July with a flat stage from Toulouse. The race finished in Paris on 29 July.

Stage 8
18 July 1906 — Toulouse to Bayonne,

Stage 9
20 July 1906 — Bayonne to Bordeaux,

Stage 10
22 July 1906 — Bordeaux to Nantes,

Stage 11
24 July 1906 — Nantes to Brest,

Stage 12
26 July 1906 — Brest to Caen,

Stage 13
29 July 1906 — Caen to Paris,

References

1906 Tour de France
Tour de France stages